Elsie Wilkins Sexton (née Wing, 27 April 1868 – 18 February 1959) was an English zoologist and biological illustrator.

Biography

Early life and education
Sexton was born Alice Wilkins Wing at Truro, Cornwall on 27 April 1868. She studied at the Truro School of Art. In 1885 she and her family moved to Plymouth. Not long after moving, she met and married Louis Edwin Sexton.

Career
Louis was a friend of Dr Edgar J Allen, the director of the Marine Biological Association and its laboratory.  In 1900 Sexton began providing Dr Allen with scientific illustrations for his publications on polychaete worms and other invertebrates. Her illustrations were first published in 1902, when Sexton provided 12 plates to the British Museum's report on the collections made during the voyage of the Southern Cross.

Although Sexton never formally trained as a zoologist in 1906 she undertook to identify and study amphipod specimens Dr Allen had collected on a field trip to the Bay of Biscay. She published her first scientific paper in 1908.  She would continue to publish over 30 scientific papers until 1951. Her research into gammarids helped clarify the complicated taxonomy of those species. Sexton had described several species of amphipods including Tryphosites alleni and Gammarus chevreuxi. The genus Sextonia was named in her honor. Sexton's discovery of a red-eyed mutation in the species Gammarus chevreuxi led to her starting a series of genetic experiments. Her work with this species also resulted in a collaboration with Julian Huxley in 1920. Sexton's genetic work on the genetics of G. chevreuxi eye color was presented as the textbook example of Mendelian inheritance in E. B. Ford's classic monograph "Mendelism and Evolution". However, Sexton herself is not acknowledged by Ford in that book.

Sexton made illustrations of carvings from Papua New Guinea for the book published by her friend Reverend John Henry Hamilton. Hamilton gave Elsie and Louis Sexton his collection of ethnographic artifacts, and these were later sold by E. W. Sexton to the British Museum and the Liverpool Museum.

Death
Sexton's daughter Mary A. F. Sexton had died in 1951, so in 1957 Sexton moved to Sussex to be with her son Colonel F. B. W. Sexton. She died on 18 February 1959 at Alfriston, Sussex, aged 90.

Etymology 
The crustacean genus Sextonia was named in her honour in 1930.

Selected bibliography

References

External links

 Photograph of Elsie Wilkins Sexton 
 Some of Elsie Wilkins Sexton's scientific illustrations on Flickr. 

1868 births
1959 deaths
Fellows of the Linnean Society of London
British marine biologists
Women marine biologists
20th-century British women scientists
British women illustrators
Scientific illustrators
People from Truro
Women geneticists
People from Alfriston